The Men's 400m Individual Medley event at the 2006 Central American and Caribbean Games occurred on Tuesday, July 18, 2006 at the S.U. Pedro de Heredia Aquatic Complex in Cartagena, Colombia.

Records at the time of the event were:
World Record: 4:08.26, Michael Phelps (USA), Athens, Greece, August 14, 2004.
Games Record: 4:26.86, Gunter Rodriguez (Cuba), 1998 Games in Maracaibo (Aug.8.1998).

Results

Final

Preliminaries

References

Men's 400 IM–Prelim results from the official website of the 2006 CACs; retrieved 2009-07-01.
Men's 400 IM–Final results from the official website of the 2006 CACs; retrieved 2009-07-01.

Medley, Men's 400m